Margarites picturatus is a species of sea snail, a marine gastropod mollusk in the family Margaritidae.

Description
The height of the shell attains 3 mm.

Distribution
This species occurs in the Sea of Japan.

References

External links
 To Encyclopedia of Life
 To World Register of Marine Species

picturatus
Gastropods described in 1967